Tad Kubler is an American guitarist, known for his work with Lifter Puller, Song of Zarathustra, and, most-notably, The Hold Steady.  He previously worked with Brett Johnson, bass player for Atmosphere, in the band Ten-fold Hate, in Minneapolis. He grew up in Janesville, Wisconsin and currently lives in Brooklyn, New York.

Education
Kubler was considered bright and energetic but difficult to handle by most of his high school teachers before he was diagnosed with ADD. He spent a year in college with a major in music at University of Wisconsin–Rock County before dropping out to move to Madison.

Influences
Kubler grew up listening to bands like Queen, Led Zeppelin, Kiss, AC/DC, Judas Priest, Thin Lizzy, ZZ Top and, perhaps most importantly, Cheap Trick. When he was seven years old, Cheap Trick's manager of the time had a wife and two daughters who lived across the street, giving Kubler the opportunity to meet Rick Nielsen.

Equipment
Electric Guitars
Gibson Les Paul Standard
Gibson SG
Gibson Les Paul Junior
Gibson ES-335
Gibson Explorer
Gibson EDS-1275 (doubleneck)

Personal life 
Kubler's daughter Murphy is a model, working with companies such as Old Navy, J.Crew, The Jessica Simpson Collection and Maddie Ziegler's clothing line "Maddie Style".

References

Living people
People from Janesville, Wisconsin
Musicians from Minneapolis
Musicians from Brooklyn
Lead guitarists
American rock guitarists
American male guitarists
American indie rock musicians
The Hold Steady members
Guitarists from Minnesota
Guitarists from New York (state)
Year of birth missing (living people)